Montenegro is a cortijada or hamlet part of the municipality of Alpujarra de la Sierra, province of Granada, Andalusia, Spain. It currently has only 5 adult inhabitants.

It is located on the old GR 7 trading route (now a long-distance footpath) that runs from Algeciras to Greece.

It was once owned by Aben Aboo, the last Moorish King in Spain   - successor to Aben Humeya.  His possessions were redistributed to the Christian families of Blanco, Medina, Romera, Ruiz and Vela who were from other parts of Spain in 1652.

References

Municipalities in the Province of Granada

es:Montenegro (Granada)